Siljevica (Serbian Cyrillic: Сиљевица) is a village in Šumadija and Western Serbia (Šumadija), in the municipality of Rekovac (Region of Levač), lying at , at the elevation of 470 m. According to the 2002 census, the village had 165 citizens.

External links
 Levac Online
 Article about Siljevica
 Pictures from Siljevica

Populated places in Pomoravlje District
Šumadija